The Schönbuch Railway is a branch line in the Stuttgart region of the German state of Baden-Württemberg. It links Dettenhausen with Böblingen, where a connection is made with lines S1 and S60 of the Stuttgart S-Bahn. Line S1 provides a direct service to Stuttgart.

The Schönbuchbahn is owned by the Zweckverband Schönbuchbahn (ZVS), and is operated by the Württembergische Eisenbahn-Gesellschaft (WEG), a member of the Veolia Transport group.

The typical service pattern consists of two trains an hour, although the frequency may reduce to one train an hour at weekends or in the evenings.

Rolling stock

Passenger services on the Schönbuchbahn use a fleet of 6 partially low floor Stadler Regio-Shuttle RS1 units. In December 2016 transport authority Zweckverband Schönbuchbahn selected Construcciones y Auxiliar de Ferrocarriles for a €51·3m contract to supply nine three-car light rail vehicles of a new design.

Gallery

References

External links 

Railway companies of Germany
Railway lines in Baden-Württemberg
Böblingen
Schönbuch